Joseph Rodney Huffman (born August 4, 1962) is an American musician. Primarily known as a keyboard player, Huffman has performed with many artists, both in the studio and live. He was a member of Witness, Drivin N Cryin and the Georgia Satellites. Joey has recorded on over 125 records as a musician and producer/engineer during his career including Bowling for Soup's A Hangover You Don't Deserve, Skinny Molly's Here For A Good Time, Miranda Lambert's Kerosene, Soul Asylum's Let Your Dim Light Shine, After the Flood: Live from Grand Forks Prom, Black Gold: The Best of Soul Asylum and Silver Lining, Meat Puppets' No Joke, Matchbox Twenty's Live From Down Under DVD, Butch Walker's Letters, CeeLo Green's Cee-Lo Green and His Perfect Imperfections, Collective Soul's Youth, Izzy Stradlin's Miami, Blackberry Smoke's New Honky Tonk Bootlegs to name a few. He has also toured with Isaac Hayes (1989), Michelle Malone and Drag the River (1990-1991), The Georgia Satellites (1992-2004), Drivin N Cryin (1994-2006), Izzy Stradlin (1993), Matchbox Twenty (1998) and Soul Asylum (1993–1997). in 2008, he performed live with Lynyrd Skynyrd, filling-in for Billy Powell. He is currently a member of Hank Williams Jr.'s touring band.

In October 2013, Huffman was diagnosed with a brain tumor. He had surgery on January 7, 2014. Not letting surgery set him back he was back on the road with Hank in March of the same year. After one and a half years he has fully recovered.

Joey is currently a partner in The Vault Recording Lounge in Marietta, GA which opened its doors in April 2014. Rick Richards, Peter Stroud, Cindy Wilson, Eddie (Cowboy) Long, Charlie Starr, and others have made guest appearances on records he has produced. Joey continues to do session work as well as write with the artists he produces. Joey was inducted into The Georgia Music Hall Of Fame with Drivin n Cryin on September 26, 2015.

Sources 

American Southern Rock musicians
20th-century American keyboardists
American male organists
Living people
1962 births
Soul Asylum members
21st-century American keyboardists
21st-century American musicians
21st-century organists
21st-century American male musicians
20th-century American male musicians
American organists